The 1995 Corby District Council election took place on 4 May 1995 to elect members of Corby Borough Council in Northamptonshire, England. This was on the same day as other local elections. The Labour Party retained overall control of the council, which it had held continuously since 1979.

Ward-by-Ward Results

Central Ward (3 seats)

Danesholme Ward (3 seats)

East Ward (2 seats)

Hazelwood Ward (3 seats)

Kingswood Ward (3 seats)

Lloyds Ward (3 seats)

Lodge Park Ward (3 seats)

Rural East Ward (1 seat)

Rural North Ward (1 seat)

Rural West Ward (1 seat)

Shire Lodge Ward (2 seats)

West Ward (2 seats)

References

1995 English local elections
1995
1990s in Northamptonshire